Psilorhynchus sucatio, the river stone carp or sucatio minnow, is freshwater ray-finned fish a species of torrent minnow. The specific name is a latinization of one of the local names for this species, sukati. It is a widely distributed species and is found in Nepal and Bangladesh as well as the Indian states of Arunachal Pradesh, Assam, Bihar, Manipur, Meghalaya, Nagaland, Uttar Pradesh and West Bengal. P. sucatio occurs in water with a fast current preferring the edges of sandy streams. In the lowlands it is abundant near emergent or overhanging vegetation, it is an altitudinal migrant. At a maximum length of 5 cm it is too small to be of any interest to fisheries but it is collected for the aquarium trade. It is the type species of the genus Psilorhynchus.

References 

sucatio
Taxa named by Francis Buchanan-Hamilton
Fish described in 1822